The men's decathlon event at the 1995 Summer Universiade was held on 1–2 September at the Hakatanomori Athletic Stadium in Fukuoka, Japan.

Medalists

Results

100 metres
Wind:Heat 1:  +1.9 m/s, Heat 2: +2.0 m/s, Heat 3: +0.2 m/s, Heat 4: +0.7 m/s

Long jump

Shot put

High jump

400 metres

110 metres hurdles
Wind:Heat 1: -1.7 m/s, Heat 2: +0.5 m/s, Heat 3: -0.6 m/s, Heat 4: +0.2 m/s

Discus throw

Pole vault

Javelin throw

1500 metres

Final standings

References

Athletics at the 1995 Summer Universiade
1995